Twice in a Blue Moon is the third studio album by Dutch trance artist Ferry Corsten, released on 1 November 2008 at his second edition of the "Full on Ferry" gig. 3 November 2008 was the official release date to purchase outwith the "Full on Ferry" gig. The first single released from the album was "Brain Box" in 2007, before the album was even announced.

The album is inspired by many goings on in Corsten's life, including the birth of his daughter, Gabriella. The album got its title from a television program about roses Corsten was watching, which featured a rose called 'Twice in a Blue Moon', with Corsten knowing that "once in a blue moon" is a saying about something that only seldom happens. He also stated that he felt the title was fitting because of the birth of his new daughter, and also having his wife's love. The love of these two persons was considered so special by Corsten that 'Twice in a Blue Moon' was considered as an appropriate title.

The album has gone through various changes, including tracks such as "Made of Love", which originally never featured vocals. Corsten decided to add vocals after playing the track live a few times as Corsten does to test some new songs.

Twice in a Blue Moon is a new step in Corsten's sound and a new style transition from his previous album L.E.F.. The latter was more of a protest against trance music due to its predictability, thus resulting in a more electronic sounding and electro-styled album. Regarding the album cover of Twice in a Blue Moon, Corsten's trademark 'F' logo (with the 'F' obviously standing for his first name Ferry) was used to make the album stand out and to fit the style of the music featured on the album. This also makes it easily recognizable to fans, old and new.

Track listing

Releases

Single releases and remixes/re-edits

Work during the Twice in a Blue Moon period 

 Corsten did the "Full on Ferry" gig on 1 November 2008.
 Corsten remixed the track "Human" by The Killers.
 On Wednesday 29 October 2008 Corsten presented a one-hour "Twice in a Blue Moon Special" on his weekly radio show Corsten's Countdown.

Charts

See also 

 Ferry Corsten discography

References

External links 
 
 Official album site
 Twice in a Blue Moon at Discogs
 

2008 albums
Ferry Corsten albums